Mordellistena bruneipennis is a beetle in the genus Mordellistena of the family Mordellidae. It was described in 1872 by McLeay.

References

bruneipennis
Beetles described in 1872